Carsten Carlberg (born December 13, 1963) is a German biochemist. He is professor of nutrigenomics at the Institute of Animal Reproduction and Food Research of the Polish Academy of Sciences in Olsztyn, Poland.

Biography
Carlberg was born in Hamburg, Germany. He attended school at Bremen, Germany, graduating in 1981 with Abitur at the Gymnasium an der Bördestrasse. From 1982 to 1987, he studied Physics and Biochemistry at the Free University of Berlin, Germany, finishing with a diploma in biochemistry. Thereafter he worked in the team of Burghardt Wittig and in 1989 received his PhD (Dr. rer. nat.) for his studies on the interaction of polymerases with DNA secondary structures at the Free University of Berlin.

From 1989 to 1992, Carlberg was a post-doctoral fellow in the team of Willi Hunziker at the Central Research Units of Hoffmann-La Roche in Basel, Switzerland, and started his work on the gene regulation of Vitamin D. From 1992 to 1997, he worked in the Dermatology Department of Jean-Hilaire Saurat at the University of Geneva, where he continued his studies of gene regulation by nuclear receptors. In 1997, Carlberg received his Habilitation at the University of Düsseldorf, Germany, and was research group leader in the Department of Physiological Chemistry of Helmut Sies.

In 2000, Carlberg was appointed full professor of biochemistry at the University of Kuopio, which in 2010 merged with the University of Joensuu to form the University of Eastern Finland. In 2006, he took a second affiliation at the University of Luxembourg, in order to create the Master program in Integrated Systems Biology there. From 2008 to 2013 he was one of 4 principal investigators at the Finnish Center of Excellence in Cardiovascular Diseases and Type 2 Diabetes Research.

Work and publications
Carlberg's research is focused on epigenetics with special focus on Vitamin D.

Over 250 of his publications are listed in the Science Citation Index. These have been cited more than 12,000 times, according to ResearcherID. Carsten Carlberg's h-index is 61.

Carsten Carlberg published textbooks on "Nutrigenomics,", "Mechanisms of Gene Regulation", and "Human Epigenomics".

Honors and prizes
2006–2009: Coordinator of the EU-funded Marie Curie Research Training Network, "NucSys".

References

External links
 Scopus
 ORCID
 University of Eastern Finland, Institute of Biomedicine
 Finnish Center of Excellence in Cardiovascular Diseases and Type 2 Diabetes Research
 Welcome2

German biochemists
Academic staff of the University of Eastern Finland
Living people
1963 births
German expatriates in Finland